Ryszard Woźniak (born June 13, 1956 in Białystok) is a Polish painter, performer and teacher.

Between 1976 and 1981 Woźniak studied at the Academy of Fine Arts in Warsaw, under Stefan Gierowski. In the years 1982-1988 he taught art at his home university. Since 1982, he was involved in Gruppa, having participated in almost all the artist group's exhibitions and campaigns, as well as having co-wrote its newsletter "Oh well" ("Oj dobrze już"). Between 1985 and 1989, together with Marek Sobczyk, Woźniak worked on the polychromy of the Neo Greek-Catholic Church of St. Nicholas, Kostomloty in the Podlaskie Voivodeship. In 1986, the artist and Ryszard Grzyb went for a scholarship to West Berlin. In 1991/1992 he lectured at the private Art School in Warsaw, founded and run by Jarosław Modzelewski and Marek Sobczyk. Since c.1992-93, he runs a painting studio at the University of Zielona Góra.

References

External links

1956 births
20th-century Polish painters
20th-century Polish male artists
21st-century Polish painters
21st-century male artists
Living people
Polish male painters